Landro may refer to:

People
Magne Landrø, a Norwegian sport shooter
Vegar Landro, a Norwegian footballer who plays for Bryne FK

Places
Landro Church, a church in Øygarden municipality in Vestland county, Norway
Landro, Vestland, a village in Øygarden municipality in Vestland county, Norway
Landro, Sicily, a village on the island of Sicily in Italy
Lago di Landro, a lake in the Dolomite mountains in South Tyrol, Italy
Landro (Galicia), a river in the region of Galicia in Spain